Dominic J. Hawken (1967 - 6th February 2023) was a keyboard player, session musician, music writer and software engineer. His music career started in the 1990s, originally playing with Boy George and Marilyn.

In 1994, he co-wrote "Stay Another Day", the UK number one single performed by East 17. He was subsequently nominated for two Ivor Novello Awards.

In the 1990s, he worked with a number of leading DJs including Danny Rampling and Boilerhouse Boys to record a number of UK hit records, including "Can I Kick It" by A Tribe Called Quest.

He is a founding Director of Deluxe Corporation.

Death
Dominic Hawken passed away at home with his family on 6th February 2023 from an aggressive form of pancreatic cancer.

References

External links
 Deluxe Corporation

English session musicians
English songwriters
English keyboardists
Living people
1967 births